Korea at the Paralympics may refer to:

North Korea at the Paralympics
South Korea at the Paralympics